Pat Kennedy (born 1952) is a former American college basketball coach.

Pat Kennedy may also refer to:

Pat Kennedy (footballer, born 1898) (1898–1981), Australian rules footballer for St Kilda
Pat Kennedy (footballer, born 1903) (1903–1981), Australian rules footballer for Carlton and Hawthorn
Matthew P. Kennedy (1908–1957), American basketball referee

See also
 Patrick Kennedy (disambiguation)
 Paddy Kennedy (disambiguation)